Brezje pri Dobjem is a settlement in the Municipality of Dobje in eastern Slovenia. The area is part of the traditional region of Styria. It is now included with the rest of the municipality in the Savinja Statistical Region.

Name
The name of the settlement was changed from Brezje to Brezje pri Dobjem in 1953.

References

External links
Brezje pri Dobjem on Geopedia

Populated places in the Municipality of Dobje